F. Yates is the name of:

 Frances Yates (1899–1981), British historian
 Frank Yates (1902–1994), pioneer of 20th century statistics